Faire Face is a French television news show created by Igor Barrère which featured documentary and debate on social subjects  and was broadcast on RTF from  1960 to 1962.

References

1960 French television series debuts
1962 French television series endings
French-language television shows
French television news shows